Cowboy churches are local Christian churches within the cowboy culture that are distinctively Western heritage in character. A typical cowboy church may meet in a rural setting in a barn, metal building, arena, sale barn, or old western building, have its own rodeo arena, and a country gospel band. Baptisms are generally done in a stock tank. The sermons are usually short and simple, in order to be better understood by the parishioners. Some cowboy churches have covered arenas where rodeo events such as bull riding, team roping, ranch sorting, team penning and equestrian events are held on weeknights.

References
 Cowboy churches rope in new Christians: Ministry attracts those looking for an alternative to traditional worship, Associated Press, 2008
 Cowboy Church in Payson Arizona, Payson Arizona News, 2013

External links
The Cowboy Church Directory
American Fellowship of Cowboy Churches
Cowboy Church Network of North America
International Cowboy Church Alliance Network

Churches in the United States
Types of church buildings
Western United States
Cowboy culture
Rodeo-affiliated events